The ushabti (also called shabti or shawabti, with a number of variant spellings) was a funerary figurine used in ancient Egyptian funerary practices.

Ushabtis were placed in tombs among the grave goods and were intended to act as servants or minions for the deceased, should they be called upon to do manual labor in the afterlife. The figurines frequently carried a hoe on their shoulder and a basket on their backs, implying they were intended to farm for the deceased. They were usually written on by the use of hieroglyphs typically found on the legs. They carried inscriptions asserting their readiness to answer the gods' summons to work.

The practice of using ushabtis originated in the Old Kingdom of Egypt (c. 2600 to 2100 BCE), with the use of life-sized reserve heads made from limestone, which were buried with the mummy. Most ushabtis were of minor size, and many produced in multiples – they sometimes covered the floor around a sarcophagus. Exceptional ushabtis are of larger size, or produced as a one-of-a-kind master work.

Due to the ushabti's commonness through all Egyptian time periods, and world museums' desire to represent ancient Egyptian art objects, the ushabti is one of the most commonly represented objects in Egyptology displays. Produced in huge numbers, ushabtis, along with scarabs, are the most numerous of all ancient Egyptian antiquities to survive.

Etymology and usage of the terms
The term shabti applies to these figures prior to the Twenty-first Dynasty of Egypt, but only after the end of the First Intermediate Period (c. 2181–2055 BCE), and really only to those figurines inscribed with Chapter Six of the Book of the Dead. Otherwise, they might better be defined by the generic term "funerary figurines".

Shabtis were servant figures that carried out the tasks required of the deceased in the underworld. It was necessary for the owner's name to be inscribed on an ushabti, along with a phrase sending them to action, written in the hieratic script. 

The shawabti were a distinct class of funerary figurines within the area of Thebes during the New Kingdom.

The term ushabti became prevalent after the 21st Dynasty and remained in use until the Ptolemaic Kingdom.

It is thought by some that the term ushabti meant "follower" or "answerer" in Ancient Egyptian, because the figurine "answered" for the deceased person and performed all the routine chores of daily life for its master in the afterlife that the gods had planned for them, although it would be difficult to reconcile this derivation with the form shawabti.

Inscriptions
Ushabti inscriptions often contain the 6th chapter of the Book of the Dead, translated as:

(Example: the deceased Ramses would have been described as "Osiris Ramses").

In rare cases different chapters of the Book of the Dead are written. Furthermore, ushabtis often mention the name and the titles of the owner, without the spells of the Book of the Dead.

Before being inscribed on funerary figurines, the spell was written on some mid-Twelfth Dynasty coffins from Deir el-Bersha (about 1850 BC) and is known today as spell 472 of the Coffin Texts.

History of usage
Mentioned first in spell 472 of the Coffin Texts, they were included in the grave goods of the dead as small figurines since the reign of Mentuhotep II of the 11th Dynasty. Some think that originally they may have symbolically replaced human sacrificial burials, called retainer sacrifices, a somewhat improbable theory as centuries had passed between the last known sacrificial burials and the appearance of the ushabtis. They were generally distinguished from other statuettes by being inscribed with the name of the deceased, his titles, and often with spell 472 of the Coffin Texts or the speech of the ushabti figure found in Chapter Six of the Book of the Dead. 

In the 18th Dynasty during the reign of Akhenaten, the figurines were inscribed with an offering addressed to the sun disk Aten, rather than the traditional speech of the ushabti figure. The ushabti was believed to magically animate after the dead had been judged, and work for the dead person as a substitute labourer in the fields of Osiris. From the New Kingdom onwards, it was often referred to as servant.

From the 21st Dynasty on, ushabtis became common and numerous in graves. In some tombs the floor was covered with a great many ushabti figurines; in others the ushabtis were neatly packed into ushabti boxes. At times, several hundred ushabti were placed in a deceased Ancient Egyptian's tomb, but pharaohs had considerably more of these servants than commoners, and king Taharqa had more than a thousand. Some tombs contained overseer or 'reis' ushabtis holding a whip, which were responsible for groups of ten ushabti each (ten being a common administrative division, for example in the armies). These overseers became rare during the Late Period.

The tomb of Tutankhamun had a large number of ushabtis of varying sizes, and most were ornate, with hieroglyph statements. They were divided into groups: some honored Osiriform gods, gold-foiled; some were more simple of wood, or faience.

Shape and material
Ushabtis were mostly mummiform, but during the Dynasty XVIII reign of Thutmose IV, they began to be fashioned as servants with baskets, sacks, and other agricultural tools. Some ushabtis were very ornate in form, and in colour, when made of enamel. They were also made of clay, wood and stone and early ones were sometimes made from wax. Later figurines were often made of less perishable materials: stone, terracotta, metal, glass and, most frequently, glazed earthenware (Egyptian faience). While ushabtis manufactured for the rich were often miniature works of art, the great mass of cheaply made ushabtis became standardised—made from single molds with little detail. The level of standardisation varied, a compositional and morphological study of faience ushabtis suggested that mass-production is an oversimplification of a complex process that may more accurately described as batch-processing.

See also 
 Dogū
 Haniwa
 Shikigami
 Stick shabti
 Terracotta Army
 Totem
 Wooden tomb model

References

Further reading

External links

  of Ushabtis

3rd-millennium BC establishments in Egypt
Egyptian artefact types
Death customs
Figurines
Art of ancient Egypt
Funerary art